WWF Brawl for All was a shootfighting tournament held in the then World Wrestling Federation that lasted from June 29, 1998 to August 24, 1998 and was the creation of then-WWF writer Vince Russo. Brawl for All resulted in a number of legitimate injuries for WWF performers, and has garnered criticism.

Inception
Throughout 1998, the WWF experienced a growth in roster size but due to limited amount of television time a number of their more genuine "tough guys" were left without much to do. As a result, the idea for a legitimate tough guy tournament was bandied about as a way to both utilize some of these men and capitalize on the recent interest in Toughman Contests around the country.

According to John "Bradshaw" Layfield, Vince Russo came up with the idea when Layfield wanted to create a hardcore wrestling division in the WWF. Russo said he devised the tournament as a consequence of Bradshaw claiming he could beat anyone on the roster in a bar fight. Jim Cornette also reported that it was Russo's idea. Participation in the tournament was strictly voluntary.

Bruce Prichard stated on his Podcast Something to Wrestle with Bruce Prichard, that when he was presented with the idea, he thought it was "the stupidest, worst idea he had ever heard". He was later reprimanded for being so negative to the Brawl for All concept.

Tournament events and injuries
Each match consisted of three one-minute rounds. Whichever wrestler connected with the most punches per round scored 5 points. In addition, a clean takedown scored 5 points and a knockdown was worth 10. If a wrestler was knocked out (decided by an eight-count rather than a ten-count), the match ended. The matches were scored by ringside judges including Gorilla Monsoon.

According to Jim Cornette, "Dr. Death" Steve Williams was the WWF's favorite to win the tournament, with the company looking towards a lucrative pay-per-view match between Williams and Stone Cold Steve Austin; Bob Holly claimed that Williams had already been paid the $100,000 prize money before his second round fight against Bart Gunn. During the third round of the fight, Gunn took Williams down, injuring Williams's hamstring, and knocked Williams out seconds later. Bart Gunn went on to defeat Bradshaw by KO on the August 24, 1998 episode of Raw is War to win the tournament and $75,000. Bradshaw received $25,000.

The WWF roster at the time had two well-known former UFC fighters, Dan Severn and Ken Shamrock. Shamrock declined the opportunity to take part, while Severn defeated The Godfather in the first round but then withdrew from the tournament, stating he had nothing to prove. In a radio interview, Severn asserted that the WWF at first had not allowed him or Shamrock to compete at all and that they removed Severn from the tournament after his first-round victory over The Godfather. However, Steve Williams recalls Shamrock "backing out" and Severn withdrawing because of his "frustration at the rules and the idea of having to wear boxing gloves".

Along with Williams, a number of other wrestlers sustained legitimate injuries during the tournament. These included the Godfather, Steve Blackman, Road Warrior Hawk, Savio Vega and Brakkus.

Reception
Fans in attendance immediately voiced their disapproval of the tournament with chants of "Boring!" and "We want wrestling!" Josh Nason of the Wrestling Observer Newsletter wrote that Brawl for All was "regarded as a terrible idea". Then-WWF official Jim Cornette has described the tournament as "the stupidest thing that the WWF has ever done", at least on television. He argued that the WWF misjudged the appeal that legitimate fighting would have to their audience, considering that the WWF had promoted the idea that their matches were merely entertainment. Furthermore, because the fighters were trained to work professional wrestling matches and not to fight, they risked both injury and the possibility that a defeat would hurt their marketability. Cornette also criticized the WWF for failing to use the tournament to promote Bart Gunn as a new star wrestler.

In the WWE documentary The Attitude Era, Jim Ross stated that it was "one of those ideas that looked really cool on paper", but John "Bradshaw" Layfield added that the execution was "a bad idea". Layfield also stated that "nobody knew Bart Gunn was that good." Ross later remarked that "No one got over". Sean Waltman called it "the dumbest fucking idea in WWE history", and felt the company educated its audience that "These guys are fighting for real, and everything else you're watching is bull shit."

Documentary series Dark Side of the Ring covered the tournament in the fourth episode of its second season.

In comparison to the North American audience, the Brawl for All had better reception in Japan, as it resulted in Bart Gunn's All Japan Pro Wrestling signing (Gunn became a successful mainstay for the company) and further advanced Steve Williams's character development on their shows.

Aftermath
Immediately prior to the Brawl for All, Holly (as "Bombastic Bob") and Gunn (as "Bodacious Bart") had been performing as a new version of The Midnight Express with Jim Cornette as their manager and had won the NWA World Tag Team Championship after defeating The Headbangers on an episode of Raw. After winning the tournament, Bart Gunn, while still under contract with the WWF, was offered an All Japan Pro Wrestling contract from owner Giant Baba, who took interest in hiring Gunn due in part to his knockout of Steve Williams. In Japan, Williams was a longtime main-eventer and held a strong reputation for his toughness, and Giant Baba sought to integrate the Brawl for All results into his storylines. After signing with All Japan in October 1998, Gunn's debut would be announced on the November 1, 1998 edition of AJPW TV, making his in-ring debut that month.

In February 1999, Gunn would return to the WWF to fulfill his contract obligations. Gunn feuded with both Bob Holly, now known as Hardcore Holly, and Steve Williams, both angry at having been beaten in the tournament, the latter masking himself and pushing Gunn off a stage.

Gunn was later matched against professional boxer Butterbean at WrestleMania XV in a boxing match; Gunn was knocked out 35 seconds into the bout and was fired by the WWF afterward. Jim Cornette was critical of Gunn being placed in a match with a pro boxer. Bob Holly claimed that Gunn's inevitable loss to Butterbean was a punishment for defeating the company's desired winner, Steve Williams. After the loss to Butterbean, Gunn returned to All Japan in May 1999, changing his ring name to Mike Barton that summer.

Post the tournament; Droz suffered career ending paralysis unrelated to the tournament during a SmackDown! taping in 1999; while Steve Blackman left in 2002, Bob Holly stayed with the company until 2009. Future WWE Hall of Fame inductees; The Godfather and Bradshaw left in 2002 and 2009 respectfully.

Mike Barton vs. Steve Williams 

In December 2000, a storyline started where "Dr. Death" Steve Williams crossed paths with Barton in a tag-team television match during the World's Strongest Tag Determination League 2000 tournament. They were on opposite teams and Williams sought to get even with Barton for his loss in the Brawl for All.

The feud with Williams would culminate into a revenge match on a January 28, 2001 pay-per-view main event, which Williams won. After this, Barton and Williams would regularly wrestle against each other throughout the first half of 2001, before the two would eventually team up later that year in October. Jim Steele and Mike Rotunda would join them in three-way or four-way tag team matches for the rest of the year before teaming occasionally until 2003.

Brawl for All tournament bracket
KO - knockout; TKO - technical knockout; Pts - points; Dec - referee's/judge's decision

1 Steve Blackman won the bout, but was forced to withdraw due to an injury sustained in training. Mero was advanced to the next round. 
2 Drozdov advanced as Road Warrior Hawk was injured during the bout.

3 Dan Severn won the bout, but he withdrew, saying he had nothing to prove. The Godfather was advanced to the next round.

References

External links
 Results at Pro Wrestling History.com

1998 in professional wrestling
WWE tournaments